Seh Chah (also Romanized as Seh Chāh; also known as Seh Chāh-e Baghal Sīāh) is a village in Rahgan Rural District, Khafr District, Jahrom County, Fars Province, Iran. At the 2006 census, its population was 177, in 42 families.

References 

Populated places in  Jahrom County